Parapercis nebulosa, the barred sandperch, is a fish species in the sandperch family, Pinguipedidae. It is found in Australia. This species can reach a length of  TL.

References

Allen, G.R. and R. Swainston, 1988. The marine fishes of north-western Australia: a field guide for anglers and divers. Western Australian Museum, Perth. 201 p.

Pinguipedidae
Taxa named by Jean René Constant Quoy
Taxa named by Joseph Paul Gaimard
Fish described in 1825
Fish of Australia